In mathematics, a free module is a module that has a basis – that is, a generating set consisting of linearly independent elements. Every vector space is a free module, but, if the ring of the coefficients is not a division ring (not a field in the commutative case), then there exist non-free modules.

A free abelian group is precisely a free module over the ring  of integers.

Definition

For a ring  and an -module , the set  is a basis for  if:

A free module is a module with a basis.

An immediate consequence of the second half of the definition is that the coefficients in the first half are unique for each element of M.

If  has invariant basis number, then by definition any two bases have the same cardinality. For example, nonzero commutative rings have invariant basis number. The cardinality of any (and therefore every) basis is called the rank of the free module . If this cardinality is finite, the free module is said to be free of finite rank, or free of rank  if the rank is known to be .

Examples 
Let R be a ring.
R is a free module of rank one over itself (either as a left or right module); any unit element is a basis.
More generally, If R is commutative, a nonzero ideal I of R is free if and only if it is a principal ideal generated by a nonzerodivisor, with a generator being a basis.
Over a principal ideal domain (e.g.), a submodule of a free module is free.
If R is commutative, the polynomial ring  in indeterminate X is a free module with a possible basis 1, X, X2, ....
Let  be a polynomial ring over a commutative ring A, f a monic polynomial of degree d there,  and  the image of t in B. Then B contains A as a subring and is free as an A-module with a basis .
For any non-negative integer n, the cartesian product of n copies of R as a left R-module, is free. If R has invariant basis number, then its rank is n.
A direct sum of free modules is free, while an infinite cartesian product of free modules is generally not free (cf. the Baer–Specker group).
A finitely generated module over a commutative local ring is free if and only if it is faithfully flat. Also, Kaplansky's theorem states a projective module over a (possibly non-commutative) local ring is free.
Sometimes, whether a module is free or not is undecidable in the set-theoretic sense. A famous example is the Whitehead problem, which asks whether a Whitehead group is free or not. As it turns out, the problem is independent of ZFC.

Formal linear combinations

Given a set  and ring , there is a free -module that has  as a basis: namely, the direct sum of copies of R indexed by E
.
Explicitly, it is the submodule of the Cartesian product  (R is viewed as say a left module) that consists of the elements that have only finitely many nonzero components. One can embed E into  as a subset by identifying an element e with that of  whose e-th component is 1 (the unity of R) and all the other components are zero. Then each element of  can be written uniquely as

where only finitely many  are nonzero.

A similar argument shows that every free left (resp. right) R-module is isomorphic to a direct sum of copies of R as left (resp. right) module.

Another construction

The free module  may also be constructed in the following equivalent way.

Given a ring R and a set E, first as a set we let

We equip it with a structure of a left module such that the addition is defined by: for x in E,

and the scalar multiplication by: for r in R and x in E,

Now, as an R-valued function on E, each f in  can be written uniquely as

(this is a variant of the Kronecker delta). Through this bijection,  is a free module with the basis E.

Universal property

The inclusion mapping  defined above is universal in the following sense. Given an arbitrary function  from a set  to a left -module , there exists a unique module homomorphism  such that ; namely,  is defined by the formula:

The uniqueness means that each R-linear map  is uniquely determined by its restriction to E.

As usual for universal properties, this defines  up to a canonical isomorphism.
,
from the category of sets to the category of left -modules. It is called the free functor and satisfies a natural relation: for each set E and a left module N,

where  is the forgetful functor, meaning  is a left adjoint of the forgetful functor.

Generalizations

Many statements about free modules, which are wrong for general modules over rings, are still true for certain generalisations of free modules. Projective modules are direct summands of free modules, so one can choose an injection into a free module and use the basis of this one to prove something for the projective module. Even weaker generalisations are flat modules, which still have the property that tensoring with them preserves exact sequences, and torsion-free modules. If the ring has special properties, this hierarchy may collapse, e.g., for any perfect local Dedekind ring, every torsion-free module is flat, projective and free as well. A finitely generated torsion-free module of a commutative PID is free. A finitely generated Z-module is free if and only if it is flat.

See local ring, perfect ring and Dedekind ring.

See also 
 Free object
 Projective object
 free presentation
 free resolution
 Quillen–Suslin theorem
 stably free module
 generic freeness

Notes

References

 
 
 .

Module theory
Free algebraic structures